The Senate was the upper house of Parliament in Mauritania from April 1992 to 2017. The Senate had 56 members, 53 members elected indirectly for a six-year term by municipal councillors with one third renewed every two years and 3 members elected by Mauritanians abroad.

The Senate was an attempt to guarantee a minimum level of representation to every part of Mauritania, irrespective of population. The Senate had especially budgetary, financial and oversight powers.

In 2017, the Senate was abolished as a result of a constitutional referendum; the last election was held in 2007.

See also
List of presidents of the Senate of Mauritania

References

External links

1992 establishments in Mauritania
2017 disestablishments in Mauritania
Defunct upper houses
Government of Mauritania
Mauritania
Government agencies disestablished in 2017